Into Paradise is the second album by English Classical crossover group All Angels, released in November 2007.

Track listing

 Sancte Deus (Nimrod)
 In Paradisum
 Make Me a Channel of Your Peace
 Swing Low
 The Scientist
 The Sound of Silence
 Lament (Band of Brothers)
 Lift Up Your Voice (Arrival of the Queen of Sheba)
 Canzonetta Sull' aria
 Pie Jesu
 Singing You Through
 Nothing Compares 2 U
 Zadok the Priest

References

External links
Official website

2007 albums
All Angels albums